Lesnoye is a rural locality (a selo) and the administrative center of Lesnoy Selsoviet, Biysky District, Altai Krai, Russia. The population was 2,008 as of 2013. There are 25 streets.

Geography 
Lesnoye is located 10 km south of Biysk (the district's administrative centre) by road. Zarechny is the nearest rural locality.

References 

Rural localities in Biysky District